The 2008–09 Vysshaya Liga season was the 17th season of the Vysshaya Liga, the second level of ice hockey in Russia. 33 teams participated in the league, and HC Yugra won the championship.

First round

Western Conference

Central Conference

Eastern Conference

Playoffs

3rd place
 (C2) Neftyanik Almetyevsk – (W1) HC Dmitrov 4:1, 1:2, 0:1 OT

External links 
 Season on hockeyarchives.info
 Season on hockeyarchives.ru

2008–09 in Russian ice hockey leagues
Rus
Russian Major League seasons